Stillingia saxatilis is a species of flowering plant in the family Euphorbiaceae. It was described in 1874 by Johannes Müller Argoviensis. It is native to Brazil, in Bahia and Minas Gerais.

References

saxatilis
Plants described in 1874
Flora of Brazil
Taxa named by Johannes Müller Argoviensis